Avianca Brasil operated the following flights at the time of its suspension of operations in May 2019.

The list includes destinations operated under the former name OceanAir.

See also
List of Avianca destinations

References

Avianca
Avianca Brazil